Oleg Yevhenovych Voyko (born March 25, 1980) is a Ukrainian former ice dancer. With former partner Julia Golovina, he is the 2003 Ukrainian national champion. They competed at the 2002 Winter Olympics and the 2006 Winter Olympics, placing 21st and 23rd, respectively.

Career 
Voyko began skating at age three. Initially a singles skater, he first took up ice dancing at age nine, and then took time off from skating. In 1996, he teamed up with Kristina Kobaladze. They placed fourth at the 1999 World Junior Championships and fifth at the 2000 World Junior Championships. They were coached by Galina Churilova in Kharkiv. Their partnership ended in 2000.

Voyko teamed up with Julia Golovina later in the same year. Their highest placement at an ISU Championship was 15th at the 2003 and 2004 European Figure Skating Championships. They skated together until 2006.

Voyko briefly competed with Natalie Bos. He works as a skating coach in Connecticut. He is married with three kids.

Programs

With Golovina

With Kobaladze

Results
GP: Grand Prix; JGP: Junior Series / Junior Grand Prix

With Golovina

With Kobaladze

References

External links

 

Ukrainian male ice dancers
Olympic figure skaters of Ukraine
Figure skaters at the 2002 Winter Olympics
Figure skaters at the 2006 Winter Olympics
Universiade medalists in figure skating
1980 births
Living people
Sportspeople from Kharkiv
Ukrainian emigrants to the United States
Universiade silver medalists for Ukraine
Competitors at the 2001 Winter Universiade
Competitors at the 2005 Winter Universiade